Luís de Sousa may refer to:

 Luís de Sousa (Cardinal)
 Luís de Sousa (writer)